Elachista enochra is a moth species in the family Elachistidae. It was described by Lauri Kaila in 2011. It is found in Turkmenistan.

The wingspan is 12.5–13 mm. The forewings are pale yellow, with the basal third of the costa narrowly grey. The hindwings are dark grey, with paler yellowish fringe scales.

References

Moths described in 2011
enochra
Moths of Asia